OS/6 (Office System/6 or System 6) is a standalone word processor made by IBM's Office Products Division (OPD), introduced in January, 1977. OS/6 was superseded by the IBM Displaywriter in 1980.

Overview
The intended configuration is a console with a keyboard, a small, approximately 9" CRT character display and either a daisy wheel or IBM 46/40 ink jet printer, renamed the IBM 6640. Documents are stored on 8-inch floppy diskettes and magnetic stripe card, which is exchangeable with IBM's previous generation of Mag Card Selectrics. The display is pre-WYSIWYG, so special symbols embedded in the displayed text mark formatting information the user can edit. Navigation is pre-mouse and uses arrow keys.

In an age before PCs, when typing was still done primarily only by clerical staff, the OS/6 was intended for what IBM envisioned as centralized word processing centers at large organizations. It includes features like mail merge, very high print quality with many formatting options and printers that can feed envelopes or sheets from two drawers, usually referred to within IBM as letterhead and second sheet. Data from Office System/6 can be migrated to IBM 5110 and 5120 with third-party applications.

Internally, the OS/6 uses an IBM proprietary 16-bit single-chip microprocessor called the OPD Mini Processor. This processor is a single-chip FET microprocessor designed by Richard Vrba. It had a 16-bit little-endian instruction set built on an 8-bit internal architecture. Sixteen general-purpose registers, implemented as a 32-byte window in memory that operated as a stack, could be used as instruction operands or for indirect references to operands in memory.

History
Development on OS/6 was done in the "Rio" project at IBM's Austin, Texas facilities.  A proposed video display upgrade for the Selectric Mag Card II had been rejected. Instead, it was announced in 1977 that Mag Card II users would be able to add a communications option to link up with System 6.

In a 1977 presentation the System 6 was shown with the models 6/430, 6/440, and 6/450. One year later the models 6/442 and 6/452 were shown additionally. System 6 building blocks are monitor,  keyboard, magnetic card unit,  inkjet, and  daisy wheel printers, and a floppy disk station.

In 1978, a stand-alone CPU (without magnetic card and printing capabilities) was added to the product line, the IBM 6/420 Information Processor.

In 1979, a communication-enabled laser printer and photocopier combination was introduced, the IBM 6670 Information Distributor.

Also in 1979, IBM General Systems Division (GSD) introduced IBM 5520 systems, not related to System 6, with some overlapping functionality and performance.

OS/6 was superseded by the IBM Displaywriter in 1980.

References

External links 
Computer museum A partially working example of a 6/420 on display
Computer museum in Dutch

IBM computers
16-bit computers
Word processors